The following is a list of past and present operators of the Vickers Viscount.

Civil operators
♠ Original operators
  318975 Ontario Ltd.
  515489 Ontario Ltd
  ASS - Australian Aircraft Sales (NSW) Pty Ltd
  Aden Airways
  Aer Lingus ♠
  Aeropostal
  Aero Clube de São Paulo
  Aero Clube Rio Claro
  Aero Flite Inc.
  Aero Jet Services Inc.
  Aero Sierra de Durango S.A.
  Aeroclube de Brazil
  Aeroelectronica
  Aeroeslava
  Aeroleasing & Sales Ltd
  Aerolineas Condor
  Aerolineas Republica
  Aerolineas TAO
  Aeropark
  Aeropesca Colombia
  Aerovias del Cesar (Aerocesar Columbia)
  Air Algerie
  Air Anglia
  Air Botswana
  Air Canada ♠
  Air Caravane
  Air Bridge Carriers
  Air Ferry
  Air France ♠
  Air Inter
  Air International UK
  Air Malawi
  Air Ogooue
  Air Rhodesia
  Airwork Services ♠
  Alidair
  Alitalia ♠
  All Nippon Airways ♠
  Aloha Airlines
  Ansett ♠
  Arkia Airlines
  Atlantic Gulf Airlines
  Austrian Airlines ♠
  Bahamas Airways
  BKS Air Transport
  Braathens SAFE
  British Air Ferries
  British Airways
  British Eagle
  British European Airways ♠
  British Midland
  British Overseas Airways Corporation (BOAC)
  British United Airways
  British West Indian Airways (BWIA) ♠
  British World Airlines
  Bouraq Indonesia Airlines
  Butler Air Transport ♠
  CAAC Airlines ♠
  Cambrian Airways
  Capital Airlines ♠
  Central African Airways ♠
  Channel Airways
  Condor Flugdienst
  Continental Airlines ♠
  Cubana ♠
  Cyprus Airways
  Dan-Air
  Eagle Airways ♠
  Euroair Transport
 Ecuato Guineana de Aviación
  Far Eastern Air Transport
  Fred. Olsen Airtransport ♠
  Ghana Airways ♠
  Guernsey Airlines
  Hawaiian Airlines
  Hong Kong Airways ♠
  Hunting Clan ♠
  Icelandair (As Air Iceland)
  Indian Airlines ♠
  Intra Airways
  Iran Air ♠
  Iraqi Airways ♠
  Istituto tecnico De Pinedo Colonna
  Janus Airways
  Kestrel Airways
  KLM ♠
  Kuwait Airways
  LOT Polish Airlines (3 in 1962-1967)
  Líneas Aéreas Canarias
  LANICA 
  Línea Aeropostal Venezolana (LAV) ♠
  London European Airways
  Lufthansa ♠
  MacRobertson Miller Airlines
  Maitland Drewery Aviation
  Malayan Airways
  Mandala Airlines
  Manx Airlines
  Maritime Central Airways
  Merpati Nusantara Airlines
  Middle East Airlines (MEA) ♠
  Misrair - United Arab Airlines ♠
  National Airways Corporation ♠
  Northeast Airlines
  Northeast Airlines ♠
  Pakistan International Airlines ♠
  Philippine Airlines ♠
  Progressive Airways
  PLUNA ♠
  Royal American Airways
  SAETA (Sociedad Anónima Ecuatoriana de Transportes Aéreos)
  Silver City Airways
  Skybus
  Somali Airlines
  South African Airways ♠
  Southern International
  Starways
  Sudan Airways ♠
  TAO
  Transair (Canada)
  Transair (UK)
  Transporte Aéreo de Colombia ♠
  TACA International Airlines (TACA)
  Trans Australia Airlines (TAA) ♠
  Trans Canada Air Lines (TCA)
  Turkish Airlines (THY) ♠
  VASP ♠
  Union of Burma Airways ♠
  United Airlines
  Virgin Atlantic
  Zambia Airways

Military operators
♠ Original operators

Royal Australian Air Force
No. 34 Squadron RAAF - Two Type 839s bought in 1964 with VIP interior, sold in 1969.

Brazilian Air Force ♠ - One Type 742 delivered in November 1956 and one Type 789 December 1957 both with VIP interior. The Type 742 was damaged beyond repair in a heavy landing in 1967, the Type 789 was withdrawn from use in 1970.

People's Liberation Army Air Force - One Type 734 bought from Pakistan in 1970, two Type 843s transferred from Civil Aviation Administration of China in 1983.

Indian Air Force ♠ - One Type 723 delivered in December 1955 and one Type 730 in January 1956, both aircraft identical apart from slight differences in VIP interiors, both sold in 1967.

Sultan of Oman Air Force - Two Type 816s bought in 1971, two Type 814s bought in 1972 and two Type 808s bought in 1973. One Type 808 crashed on delivery and the five survivors were all sold between 1976 and 1979.

Pakistan Air Force ♠ - One Type 734 delivered in March 1956 with VIP interior. Sold to Chinese Air Force in 1970.

South African Air Force
No. 21 Squadron SAAF ♠ - One Type 781 delivered in June 1958 with VIP interior.

Turkish Air Force - Two Type 794Ds bought in 1971 with another bought in 1972.

Empire Test Pilots School - One Type 744 and one Type 745 bought in 1962 and withdrawn from use in 1971 and 1972.
Royal Radar Establishment - One Type 837 bought in 1964 and one Type 838 bought in 1965.

Corporate and government operators
The Viscount was also operated by corporate operators particularly in the United States, the following bought the aircraft new:
 Canadian Department of Transport ♠ - One Type 737 delivered in March 1955. was followed by a Type 797 in 1957
 Iranian Government ♠ -  One Type 839 delivered in May 1961 
 Standard Oil Company ♠ - One Type 765 delivered in 1957.
 United States Steel Corporation ♠ - Three Type 764s delivered in 1956.
 Union Carbide ♠ - One Type 839 delivered in 1959.

References
Notes

Bibliography

 Andrews, C.F. and E.B. Morgan. Vickers Aircraft since 1908.  London: Putnam, Second Edition, 1988. .
 Eastwood, Tony. and Roach, John Turbo Prop Airliner Production List. West Drayton, UK: Aviation Hobby Shop, 1990. . 
 Turner, P. St. John. Handbook of the Vickers Viscount. London: Ian Allan Publishing, 1968. .

Viscount